Albești may refer to the following places in Romania:

Populated places
 Albești, Botoșani, a commune in Botoșani County
 Albești, Constanța, a commune in Constanța County
 Albești, Ialomița, a commune in Ialomița County
 Albești, Mureș, a commune in Mureș County
 Albești, Vaslui, a commune in Vaslui County
 Albești, a village in Albeștii de Muscel Commune, Argeș County
 Albești, a village in Răbăgani Commune, Bihor County
 Albești, a village in Smeeni Commune, Buzău County
 Albești, a village in Șimnicu de Sus Commune, Dolj County
 Albești, a village in Brăești Commune, Iași County
 Albești, a village in Poboru Commune, Olt County
 Albești, a village in Vedea Commune, Teleorman County
 Albești, a village in Delești Commune, Vaslui County

Rivers
 Albești (Bahlueț), a tributary of the Bahlueț in Iași County
 Albești (Black Sea), a tributary of the Black Sea in Constanța County
 Albești (Cungrișoara), a tributary of the Cungrișoara in Olt County